Javark (also known as Javarg and Jeverg) is a village in Shesh Pir Rural District, Hamaijan District, Sepidan County, Fars Province, Iran. At the 2006 census, its population was 254, in 60 families.

References 

Populated places in Sepidan County